The province of Piacenza is a province in the Emilia-Romagna region of Italy. Its provincial capital is the city Piacenza. The city Piacenza has a population of 102,269, as of 2015. The provincial president is Patrizia Barbieri and it contains 48 comuni (singular: comune). The province dates back to its founding by the Romans in 218 BCE.

History
Piacenza was founded by the Romans for military purposes in 218 BCE. It was conquered by Carthaginian Hasdrubal II in 207 BCE and the city was sacked in 200 BCE by the Gauls. A key city in the region, it was destroyed by barbarians but the town was rebuilt under the rule of bishops in the 10th century. By the 12th century, the city was a free comune and it later fought against Frederick I, Holy Roman Emperor as part of the Lombard League. In the Renaissance period it passed from French, to papal, to Viscontis, to Sforzas rule. Pope Paul III formed the Duchy of Parma and Piacenza and Piacenza became part of this duchy. It voted for a union between it and Piedmont in May 1848; this union was enacted in 1859.

In October 2012, it was confirmed that the Province of Piacenza would be merged with the Province of Parma in 2014 to become the Province of Piacenza and Parma, despite controversy over the chosen name. However, after the dismissal of premier Mario Monti, the provincial union was cancelled.

Geography
The province of Piacenza is the westernmost of the nine provinces in the region of Emilia-Romagna in northwestern Italy. It is bounded on the east by the Province of Parma, and to the north by the Province of Cremona, the Province of Lodi, and the Province of Pavia in the region of Lombardy. The Province of Alessandria lies to the west in the region of Piedmont, and to the south lies the Province of Genoa in the region of Liguria.

The alluvial Po Plain is agricultural land and there are many vineyards growing grapes from which the eighteen wines of the region are made. There is some light industry, mostly in the mechanical sector, and some of this is linked to the agriculture sector.

References

External links
 
 
Provincia di Piacenza homepage 
Piacenzainternet.it - Portale di Piacenza 

 
Piacenza